Fade to Black is a 2006 British political thriller drama film directed by Oliver Parker and starring Danny Huston as Orson Welles.

Plot
In 1947 Hollywood, Orson Welles had a divorce from Rita Hayworth. When he travels to Rome for the lead role in Black Magic, an actor is murdered on set and Welles finds himself allured by the deceased's beautiful stepdaughter (Paz Vega). Soon he becomes embroiled in dangerous political games as the run-up to post-war elections surfaces.

Cast
 Danny Huston as Orson Welles
 Diego Luna as Tommaso Moreno 
 Paz Vega as Lea Padovani 
 Christopher Walken as Brewster
 Nathaniel Parker as Viola
 Anna Galiena as Aida Padovani 
 Violante Placido as Stella
 Pino Ammendola as Grisha

References

External links
 
 
 Ken Russell, Fade to Black gives us Orson Welles as a hungry hustler, Times of London review, 6 March 2008.

2006 films
2006 thriller drama films
Films about films
Films about Orson Welles
Films directed by Oliver Parker
Films set in 1947
Films shot in Serbia
British neo-noir films
2000s political thriller films
British political thriller films
2006 drama films
2000s English-language films
2000s British films